The 6th Magritte Awards ceremony, presented by the Académie André Delvaux, honored the best films of 2015 in Belgium and took place on February 6, 2016, at the Square in the historic site of Mont des Arts, Brussels beginning at 8:00 p.m. CET. During the ceremony, the Académie André Delvaux presented Magritte Awards in 22 categories. The ceremony was televised in Belgium by BeTV. Actress Marie Gillain presided the ceremony, while Charlie Dupont hosted the show for the second time.

The nominees for the 6th Magritte Awards were announced on January 12, 2016. Films with the most nominations were The Brand New Testament with ten, followed by All Cats Are Grey with nine and Alleluia with eight. The winners were announced during the awards ceremony on February 6, 2016. The Brand New Testament won four awards, including Best Film and Best Director for Jaco Van Dormael. Other multiple winners were Alleluia also with four awards, and All Cats Are Grey with two.

Winners and nominees

Best Film
 The Brand New Testament (Le Tout Nouveau Testament) All Cats Are Grey (Tous les chats sont gris)
 I'm Dead But I Have Friends (Je suis mort mais j'ai des amis)
 Melody
 Prejudice

Best Director
 Jaco Van Dormael – The Brand New Testament (Le Tout Nouveau Testament) Bernard Bellefroid – Melody
 Savina Dellicour – All Cats Are Grey (Tous les chats sont gris)
 Fabrice Du Welz – Alleluia

Best Actor
 Wim Willaert – I'm Dead But I Have Friends (Je suis mort mais j'ai des amis) François Damiens – La Famille Bélier
 Bouli Lanners – All Cats Are Grey (Tous les chats sont gris)
 Jérémie Renier – The Wakhan Front (Ni le ciel ni la terre)

Best Actress
 Veerle Baetens – Un début prometteur
 Annie Cordy – Memories (Les Souvenirs)
 Christelle Cornil – What Jacques Saw (Jacques a vu)
 Yolande Moreau – Journey Through China (Voyage en Chine)

Best Supporting Actor
 Laurent Capelluto – The Clearstream Affair (L'Enquête)
 Arno Hintjens – Prejudice
 David Murgia – The Brand New Testament (Le Tout Nouveau Testament)
 Marc Zinga – Dheepan

Best Supporting Actress
 Anne Coesens – All Cats Are Grey (Tous les chats sont gris)
 Yolande Moreau – The Brand New Testament (Le Tout Nouveau Testament)
 Helena Noguerra – Alleluia
 Babetida Sadjo – Waste Land

Most Promising Actor
 Benjamin Ramon – Être
 Arthur Bols – Prejudice
 Romain Gelin – The Brand New Testament (Le Tout Nouveau Testament)
 David Thielemans – Chubby (Bouboule)

Most Promising Actress
 Lucie Debay – Melody
 Manon Capelle – All Cats Are Grey (Tous les chats sont gris)
 Pili Groyne – The Brand New Testament (Le Tout Nouveau Testament)
 Stéphanie Van Vyve – Être

Best Screenplay
 The Brand New Testament (Le Tout Nouveau Testament) – Thomas Gunzig and Jaco Van Dormael Alleluia – Fabrice Du Welz and Vincent Tavier
 I'm Dead But I Have Friends (Je suis mort mais j'ai des amis) – Guillaume Malandrin and Stéphane Malandrin
 Prejudice – Antoine Cuypers and Antoine Wauters

Best First Feature Film
 All Cats Are Grey (Tous les chats sont gris) Next Year (L'Année prochaine)
 Prejudice

Best Flemish Film
 The Ardennes (D'Ardennen) Belgian Rhapsody (Brabançonne)
 Cafard
 Waste Land

Best Foreign Film in Coproduction
 La Famille Bélier
 Marguerite
 Song of the Sea
 The Wakhan Front (Ni le ciel ni la terre)

Best Cinematography
 Alleluia – Manuel Dacosse
 The Brand New Testament (Le Tout Nouveau Testament) – Christophe Beaucarne
 Prejudice – Frédéric Noirhomme

Best Production Design
 Alleluia – Emmanuel de Meulemeester
 All Cats Are Grey (Tous les chats sont gris) – Paul Rouschop
 I'm Dead But I Have Friends (Je suis mort mais j'ai des amis) – Eve Martin

Best Costume Design
 The Lady in the Car with Glasses and a Gun (La Dame dans l'auto avec des lunettes et un fusil) – Pascaline Chavanne
 All Cats Are Grey (Tous les chats sont gris) – Sabine Zappitelli
 I'm Dead But I Have Friends (Je suis mort mais j'ai des amis) – Elise Ancion

Best Original Score
 The Brand New Testament (Le Tout Nouveau Testament) – An Pierlé
 Alleluia – Vincent Cahay
 Melody – Frédéric Vercheval

Best Sound
 Alleluia – Emmanuel de Boissieu, Frédéric Meert, and Ludovic Van Pachterbeke
 The Brand New Testament (Le Tout Nouveau Testament) – François Dumont, Michel Schillings, and Dominique Warnier
 I'm Dead But I Have Friends (Je suis mort mais j'ai des amis) – Marc Bastien, Marc Engels, and Franco Piscopo

Best Editing
 Alleluia – Anne-Laure Guégan
 All Cats Are Grey (Tous les chats sont gris) – Ewin Ryckaert
 I'm Dead But I Have Friends (Je suis mort mais j'ai des amis) – Yannick Leroy

Best Live Action Short Film
 The Black Bear (L'Ours noir)
 Jay Amongst Men (Jay parmi les hommes)
 Tout va bien

Best Animated Short Film
 Last Door South (Dernière porte au Sud)
 The Scent of Carrots (Le Parfum de la carotte)
 A Slice of the Country (Tranche de campagne)

Best Documentary Film
 The Man Who Mends Women: The Wrath of Hippocrates (L'Homme qui répare les femmes: la colère d'Hippocrate)
 Employment Office (Bureau de chômage)
 I Don't Belong Anywhere: The Cinema of Chantal Akerman
 Ship of Fools (La Nef des fous)

Honorary Magritte Award
 Vincent Lindon

Films with multiple nominations and awards

The following twelve films received multiple nominations.

 Ten: The Brand New Testament
 Nine: All Cats Are Grey
 Eight: Alleluia
 Seven: I'm Dead But I Have Friends
 Six: Prejudice
 Four: Melody
 Two: Être, La Famille Bélier, The Wakhan Front, and Waste Land

The following three films received multiple awards.
 Four: The Brand New Testament and Alleluia
 Two: All Cats Are Grey

See also

 41st César Awards
 21st Lumières Awards
 2015 in film

References

External links
 
 
 6th Magritte Awards at AlloCiné

2016
2015 film awards
2016 in Belgium